Tuek Thla is a commune (sangkat) of Sen Sok District (previously in Russey Keo District) in Phnom Penh, Cambodia.
The Salesian Sisters of Don Bosco has been running a Don Bosco Vocation Training Centre for Girls at Tuek Thla, Phnom Penh since 1983.

References

Tuek Thla, Sangkat